Abapeba is a genus of Central and South American corinnid sac spiders first described by A. B. Bonaldo in 2000.

Species
 it contains twenty species from Mexico and the Caribbean down to Brazil:
Abapeba abalosi (Mello-Leitão, 1942) – Paraguay, Argentina
Abapeba brevis (Taczanowski, 1874) – French Guiana
Abapeba cayana (Taczanowski, 1874) – French Guiana
Abapeba cleonei (Petrunkevitch, 1926) – St. Thomas
Abapeba echinus (Simon, 1896) – Brazil
Abapeba grassima (Chickering, 1972) – Panama
Abapeba guanicae (Petrunkevitch, 1930) – Puerto Rico
Abapeba hirta (Taczanowski, 1874) – French Guiana
Abapeba hoeferi Bonaldo, 2000 – Brazil
Abapeba kochi (Petrunkevitch, 1911) – South America
Abapeba lacertosa (Simon, 1898) (type) – St. Vincent, Trinidad, northern South America
Abapeba luctuosa (F. O. Pickard-Cambridge, 1899) – Mexico
Abapeba lugubris (Schenkel, 1953) – Venezuela
Abapeba pennata (Caporiacco, 1947) – Guyana
Abapeba rioclaro Bonaldo, 2000 – Brazil
Abapeba rufipes (Taczanowski, 1874) – French Guiana
Abapeba saga (F. O. Pickard-Cambridge, 1899) – Mexico
Abapeba sicarioides (Mello-Leitão, 1935) – Brazil
Abapeba taruma Bonaldo, 2000 – Brazil
Abapeba wheeleri (Petrunkevitch, 1930) – Puerto Rico

References

Araneomorphae genera
Corinnidae
Spiders of Central America
Spiders of Mexico
Spiders of South America
Spiders of the Caribbean